The 2018–19 Maltese Premier League was the 104th season of top-flight league football in Malta. The season began on 17 August 2018 and ended in April 2019. Defending champions Valletta won their 25th title, following a penalty shootout win against Hibernians in a championship decider match.

Teams 

Lija Athletic and Naxxar Lions were relegated after they finished thirteenth and fourteenth the previous season. They are replaced by Qormi and Pietà Hotspurs, the 2017–18 Maltese First Division champions and runners-up respectively. Tarxien Rainbows retained Premiership status by defeating Żejtun Corinthians in a play-off decider.

Personnel and kits 

 Additionally, referee kits are made by Adidas, sponsored by TeamSports and FXDD, and Nike has a new match ball.

Venues

Managerial changes

League table

Results

Positions by round 

The table lists the positions of teams after each week of matches. In order to preserve chronological evolvements, any postponed matches are not included to the round at which they were originally scheduled, but added to the full round they were played immediately afterwards.

Championship play-off 

At the end of the season, Valletta and Hibernians finished off equal on 58 points; in the last matchday, Valletta were few minutes away from winning the title as they were leading 1–0 against Ħamrun Spartans, but a goal in stoppage time levelled the match. Hibernians had a convincing 5–1 win over Balzan to force a championship decider to be played between the two on 4 May.

Valletta qualified for the 2019–20 UEFA Champions League First qualifying round.
Hibernians qualified for the 2019–20 UEFA Europa League First qualifying round.

Relegation play-offs 

A play-off match took place between the twelfth-placed team from the Premier League, St. Andrews, and the third-placed team from the First Division, St. Lucia, for a place in the 2019–20 Maltese Premier League. St. Lucia became the first First Division club to win a Premier League play-off, thereby booking a place in next season's Premier League for the first time in their history.

Season statistics

Top goalscorers

Hat-tricks

Awards

Monthly awards

Annual awards

References

External links 
 Official website

Maltese Premier League seasons
Malta
1